Ropshitz  may refer to
the town Ropczyce in southern Poland
chasidic dynasty Ropshitz emanating from that town